Mafalda-Cecilia von Saxe-Coburg-Gotha-Koháry (Mafalda-Cecilia Sakskoburggotska; born 27 July 1994), known professionally as Ona Mafalda, is a British singer-songwriter and member of the former Bulgarian royal family. As a granddaughter of Simeon II, the last reigning tsar of Bulgaria, she is a princess of the House of Saxe-Coburg and Gotha-Koháry.

Early life and family 
Mafalda was born on 27 July 1994 in London to Rosario Nadal, a Spanish aristocrat and art director, and Kyril, Prince of Preslav, a member of the Bulgarian royal family. She is a granddaughter of Simeon II of Bulgaria, who was the last tsar of the Kingdom of Bulgaria and later served as the prime minister of the Republic of Bulgaria.

In 1999 Mafalda served as a bridal attendant in the wedding of Princess Alexia of Greece and Denmark and Carlos Morales Quintana.

She grew up in London and later moved to the United States to attend Berklee College of Music in Boston, where she was a student for three years.

Music career 
Mafalda describes her music as "dark pop" and cites Lana Del Rey, Cat Power, Lauryn Hill, The Strokes, Belle & Sebastian, and Kaiser Chiefs as musical influences. She started writing music when she was fourteen years old. She released her first single, Don't Let Go, in 2015 while she was a student at Berklee. She released an extended play titled Daisy Chain in June 2019, which was produced by Ian Barter and Doug Schadt.

In 2016, she performed for a Valentino fashion show at Island Club on the Athens Riviera in Greece. Mafalda has performed in New York Fashion Week and went on a music tour in Italy in 2019.

Personal life 
Mafalda moved to New York City in 2017 and lives in Lower Manhattan.

In 2016 she was featured in a society list of New Modern Swans by Town & Country.

On May 28, 2022, she married Marc Abousleiman in Palma, Mallorca.

References 

Living people
1994 births
Berklee College of Music alumni
Bulgarian princesses
English people of Bulgarian descent
English people of Spanish descent
English women pop singers
English women singer-songwriters
German duchesses
House of Saxe-Coburg and Gotha (Bulgaria)
Princesses of Saxe-Coburg and Gotha
Singers from London
21st-century English women singers
21st-century English singers